Jonathan Holland (born 15 July 1978) is a Maltese former professional footballer who played as a midfielder. He has served as the caretaker manager of Birkirkara.

Playing career 
Holland was born in Pietà, Malta. He made his debut with Floriana in the Maltese Premier League in the 1994–95 season. After ten seasons with Floriana, in 2005 he joined Birkirkara. Holland also had spells with National League side, Bradford Park Avenue.

He also appeared 18 times for the Malta national team, debuting on 28 April 1999 in a 2–1 defeat against Iceland.

Career statistics

References

External links 
 
 

1978 births
Living people
People from Pietà, Malta
Maltese footballers
Association football midfielders
Malta international footballers
Floriana F.C. players
Bradford (Park Avenue) A.F.C. players
Birkirkara F.C. players
Ħamrun Spartans F.C. players
Nairn County F.C. players
Marsaxlokk F.C. managers
Maltese expatriate footballers
Maltese expatriate sportspeople in England
Expatriate footballers in England
Maltese expatriate sportspeople in Scotland
Expatriate footballers in Scotland